The team eventing competition was one of six equestrian events on the Equestrian at the 1992 Summer Olympics programme. Dressage and endurance portions of the competition were held at the Club Hípic El Montanyà, the stadium jumping stage was held at Real Club de Polo de Barcelona. The scores of the top three rider/horse pairs for each nation in the individual event were summed to give a team score.

The competition was split into three phases:

Dressage (28 July)
Riders performed the dressage test.
Endurance (29 July)
Riders tackled roads and tracks, steeplechase and cross-country portions.
Jumping (30 July)
Riders jumped at the show jumping course.

Results

References

Team eventing